The 1925 municipal election was held December 14, 1925 to elect a mayor and seven aldermen to sit on Edmonton City Council and four trustees to sit on each of the public and separate school boards.  In the election's only plebiscite, the voters also rejected a proposal to increase the mayor's term from one year to two.

There were ten aldermen on city council, but three of the positions were already filled: Will Werner, Charles Gibbs, and Daniel Knott were all elected to two-year terms in 1924 and were still in office.  James Collisson and Joseph Clarke had also been elected in 1924, but both resigned to run for mayor.  Accordingly, Charles Robson and Alfred Farmilo were elected to one-year terms.

There were seven trustees on the public school board, but three of the positions were already filled:  Joseph Adair, Thyrza Bishop, and T J Johnston had all been elected to two-year terms in 1924 and were still in office.  The same was true on the separate board, where C E Barry, E A Carrigan, and P M Dunne were continuing.

Voters in this election cast ranked votes. In the mayoral contest where one member was elected, the contest was conducted according to Instant-runoff voting; in contests where multiple members were elected, such as for city council and school boards, the contest was conducted according to the single transferable vote system.

The mayor was elected to a one year term, the term being finished in December 1926; all others were elected to two year terms, their terms being finished in December 1927.

Voter turnout

There were 15304 ballots cast out of 35343 eligible voters, for a voter turnout of 43.3%.

Results

 bold or  indicates elected
 italics indicate incumbent
 "SS", where data is available, indicates representative for Edmonton's South Side, with a minimum South Side representation instituted after the city of Strathcona, south of the North Saskatchewan River, amalgamated into Edmonton on February 1, 1912.

Mayor
This election was conducted using Instant-runoff voting but no vote transfers were conducted in this case because Blatchford received a majority of votes on the first count.

Aldermen
This election was conducted using Single transferable voting.

Because of the single transferable vote system, Tighe received more initial votes, but Farmilo won (and Robson held) based on votes subsequently transferred from other candidates.

Douglas resigned less than a year later to run for mayor in the 1926 Edmonton municipal election.

Public school trustees

Separate (Catholic) school trustees

Under the minimum South Side representation rule, Crossland was elected over Jenvrin.

Mayoral Term Plebiscite

Are you in favour of the Mayor holding office for the term of two years?
Yes - 7251
No - 8945

References

Election History, City of Edmonton: Elections and Census Office

1925
1925 elections in Canada
1925 in Alberta